Hettlingen is a railway station in the Swiss canton of Zurich and municipality of Hettlingen. It is located on the Rheinfall line and is served by Zurich S-Bahn lines S12 and S33.

References

External links 

Hettlingen station on Swiss Federal Railway's web site

Hettlingen
Hettlingen